Rutans are a fictional extraterrestrial race from the British science fiction television series Doctor Who. They have been at war with the Sontaran Empire for more than 50,000 years, (though another account claimed 10,000 years, though it is not known whether this Rutan was using a human timescale) and this war dominates both cultures to the exclusion of all else. The Sontaran-Rutan war has never been depicted on television, but has featured in spin-off media. The Rutans only appeared on television in the serial Horror of Fang Rock, in which a single Rutan is encountered, though they are mentioned in some serials featuring Sontarans (The Time Warrior, The Sontaran Experiment, The Two Doctors and "The Poison Sky", as well as The Last Sontaran and Enemy of the Bane episodes of the Doctor Who spin-off The Sarah Jane Adventures).

Characteristics
In their natural forms, Rutans resemble large green jellyfish, glowing blobs of biomatter with long ropey tentacles. They are amphibious and can cling to sheer vertical surfaces, with considerable mobility out of the water despite their shape. Rutans can also generate lethal bioelectrical shocks, and seem to be able to absorb electrical energy directly for sustenance. They reproduce by a process similar to binary fission. Rutans can speak, although the exact mechanism by which this works is unknown, as no mouth has been observed on their body. The Rutan observed in Horror of Fang Rock spoke with a harsh, tinny male voice, and also used the pronouns "we" and "us" when referring to itself, suggesting that the species may exist as a kind of hive mind.

Rutans are able to operate independently, and, like the Sontarans, sometimes dispatch scout units consisting of a single soldier.

Rutans have also developed advanced shape-shifting technology, allowing them to appear in any form they wish, although the Rutan encountered by the Doctor in Horror of Fang Rock stated that they found humanoid forms difficult to maintain. They often use this technology to adapt to alien environments and infiltrate alien cultures; Rutans are consummate spies. A Rutan usually kills specific individuals and then impersonates them.

Other appearances
The Rutans have made appearances in the Missing Adventure novel Lords of the Storm by David A. McIntee and in Terrance Dicks's New Adventure novel Shakedown (based on the spin-off video Shakedown: Return of the Sontarans, also written by Dicks). These novels were both released in December 1995, and the former novel leads into the latter. Rutans are also mentioned in the Missing Adventures novel Evolution, in which the antagonists of the story are using a sample of Rutan "healing gel" to cross-mutate humans and animals.

The novel of Shakedown elaborates that the Rutan "hive mind" is co-ordinated by a Queen who lives on their well-defended homeworld, and that without her influence the Host would fall apart. In the same novel, Rutan biotechnology is sufficiently advanced to "uplift" a species to sentience; they have done this at least once, on the planet Sentarion, where they are worshipped by the insectoid Sentarii people as "the Shining Ones". The organic nature of Rutan technology is one of the chief differences between them and their Sontaran enemies.  The video Shakedown is the only occasion in which Sontarans and Rutans have appeared together on screen.

An unspecified incarnation of the Doctor (but fitting the description of the Eighth) brokered a peace between the Sontarans and the Rutans in the Lance Parkin Past Doctor Adventures novel The Infinity Doctors. As with all of the spin-off media, the canonicity of the novels and videos are uncertain.

In the New Series Adventures Quick Reads book The Sontaran Games, by Jacqueline Rayner, it is revealed that the character Emma, who acts as the Doctor's companion-substitute in the book, is a Rutan spy disguised as a human it killed.

In the full-length New Series Adventures book The Taking of Chelsea 426, by David Llewellyn, the Rutans again appear alongside their enemies the Sontarans. In this book, the Rutans had learned of the Sontarans' attack on Earth in the 21st century, and had planted a cloud of spores into Saturn's atmosphere. These spores were originally intended to infect the Sontarans, after they had taken over Earth and expanded to the rest of the Solar System - however, due to the intervention of the Doctor, the Sontarans were defeated, and humans instead reached Saturn a number of centuries later, and were infected themselves when they breathed in the spores. These spores allegedly contained Rutans, allowing them to take over the host (though the host itself remains alive). Their appearance led to the attack of the Sontarans on Chelsea 426. The Rutans were eventually defeated by the Doctor, but had by that time infected a number of the Sontarans as well. The Sontarans then headed back to Sontaran space, unknowing that they were carrying Rutans into their territory.

The Rutans also appeared in the BBV audio play In 2 Minds, which used the idea of Rutans detached from the Host as a metaphor for the treatment of Gulf War Syndrome sufferers by the UK and US military.  Bernice Summerfield encountered the Rutans in the Big Finish Productions audio drama The Bellotron Incident.

The Rutans' first appearance in the Doctor Who range of Big Finish Productions audio stories was Castle of Fear, with the Fifth Doctor and Nyssa, where it is revealed that Linx came to Earth in The Time Warrior seeking a Rutan force who were attempting a complex program to clone Rutans in human form to act as soldiers. They also have a cameo in the Sixth Doctor Companion Chronicles story, Beyond the Ultimate Adventure.  Most recently, they make a surprise appearance in the Sixth Doctor Lost Story, The First Sontarans, battling against their oldest foes. In this abandoned script from the mid-1980s, it is revealed that the Sontarans were super-soldiers, genetically manufactured by the humanoid scientists of Sontar, specifically to oppose a Rutan invasion; the story features the Sixth Doctor discovering the last of the Sontarans' creators, who initially attempt to make a deal with the Rutans to mass produce anti-Sontaran weapons, before they are forced to recognize that their home planet has been decimated by centuries of Sontaran occupation and they can do nothing to bring it back.

The Rutans return in "The Gunpowder Plot", the fifth instalment of The Adventure Games series. In this game, the TARDIS accidentally collides with a Rutan ship, causing it to crash in 1205. 400 years later, a Rutan from the ship takes the guise of Lady Winters, and collaborates with Robert Catesby and Guy Fawkes to blow up Parliament, the explosion of which will provide power to the Rutan ship so it can take off. Sontarans led by Field Major Kaarsh arrive in pursuit of the Rutan ship, and the Doctor discovers from Winters that the Rutan ship was on a special mission to wipe out the Sontarans with two 'doomsday weapons': genetic-targeting weapons which would kill only Sontarans, explaining why the Sontarans are so adamant to track this ship down. After prompting Guy Fawkes to detonate some gunpowder early, the Doctor catches the Houses of Parliament in a pocket of time in space. Within the house, Rutans and Sontarans come into conflict with each other, a conflict which is resolved when the Doctor decides to give each of the two doomsday weapons to both sides, revealing that he reprogrammed one of them to target Rutans, and no one knows whose weapon will target whom. In the end, neither weapon is activated and both the Sontarans and Rutans agree to leave Earth, though Winters angrily claims that whatever more death and destruction their war causes will be the Doctor's fault.

The Fifth Doctor encounters the Rutans in conflict with the Sontarans on a barren planet in the comic story Prisoners of Time, an eleven-Doctor special released by IDW Publishing (who held the rights at the time to publish Doctor Who comics in the US) across 2013 as part of the 50th anniversary of Doctor Who. The Doctor, Adric, Nyssa and Tegan are unable to prevent a massacre of the outnumbered Sontarans at the Rutans' hands.

References

External links

Doctor Who races
Fictional shapeshifters
Television characters introduced in 1977